Ben Hope is a mountain in northern Scotland.

Ben Hope may also refer to:

 Ben Hope, a character from the graphic novel Heartstopper
 Ben Hope, a series of novels by Scott Mariani

See also

 Benjamin Hope (born 1976), British painter